Israel and Mauritania relations refers to the historic and current bilateral relationship between Israel and Mauritania. In 1999, Mauritania became the third member of the Arab League—after Egypt and Jordan—to recognize Israel as a sovereign state. The two countries established full diplomatic relations in October 1999. However, as a response to the Gaza War (2008–09), relations were frozen since 2009.

History
Mauritania declared war on Israel as a result of the 1967 Six-Day War, following the Arab League's collective decision (Mauritania was not admitted to the League until November 1973), and did not reverse that declaration until 1991. For some 32 years until about early 1999, Israelis were seemingly oblivious to the ongoing state of war.

Mauritania did not abide by moves to recognize Israel's right to exist in the same way as most other Arab countries, after the earlier 1967 Khartoum Resolution.

Little public information exists as to the state of war, and it has been inferred that the declaration of war had been reversed by 1999 from : 
 behind the scenes meetings between Mauritania and Israel in 1995 and 1996 said to be at the instigation of Mauritania's President Ould Taya;
 the establishment of unofficial "interest sections" in the respective Spanish embassies in 1996 in the two capital cities, leading to;
 the exchange of diplomatic representatives in each other's countries from 27 October 1999.

In 1999 Mauritania became one of three members of the 22-member Arab League to recognize Israel as a sovereign state (the others being Egypt and Jordan). This recognition was given by former President Maaouya Ould Sid'Ahmed Taya along with his cooperation with United States anti-terrorism activities. The establishment of full diplomatic relations was signed in Washington DC on October 28, 1999.

After the coup by the Military Council for Justice and Democracy in August 2005 that ousted President Ould Taya, recognition of Israel was maintained.

As a response to the Gaza War, relations were frozen with Israel in January 2009. In February 2009, Mauritania recalled its ambassador from Israel, and on 6 March 2009 staff were evicted from the Israeli embassy in Nouakchott, and given 48 hours to leave Mauritania. Israel officially closed the embassy later in the day, according to an announcement by its Foreign Affairs Ministry. By 21 March 2010 all diplomatic relations between the two states had officially come to an end.

Following the Israel–United Arab Emirates peace agreement in August 2020, Mauritania's foreign ministry said that his country trusted the "wisdom and good judgement" of the United Arab Emirates leadership for signing an accord with Israel to agree to normalize relations, and that "the UAE possesses absolute sovereignty and complete independence in conducting its relations and assessing the positions it takes in accordance with its national interest and the interests of Arabs."

See also
 Foreign relations of Israel
 Foreign relations of Mauritania 
 List of ambassadors of Israel to Mauritania 
 2008 attack on the Israeli embassy in Mauritania
 History of the Jews in Mauritania

References

 
Bilateral relations of Mauritania
Mauritania